Texas's 9th congressional district of the United States House of Representatives includes the southwestern portion of the Greater Houston area in Texas. The current Representative for the district, since 2005, is Democrat Al Green.

From 1967 to 2005, the 9th covered an area stretching from Galveston through Houston to Beaumont. Much of that area is now the 2nd district. Most of the area now in the 9th was in the 25th district from 1983 to 2005.

List of members representing the district

Election results from presidential races

Election results

2004

2006

2008

2010

2012

2014

2016

2018

2020

2022

Historical district boundaries

From 1967 to 2005, the district included the Johnson Space Center, and from 1935 to 2005, it took in Galveston.

See also
List of United States congressional districts

References

 Congressional Biographical Directory of the United States 1774–present

09
Harris County, Texas